The agile gibbon (Hylobates agilis), also known as the black-handed gibbon, is an Old World primate in the gibbon family. It is found in Indonesia on the island of Sumatra, Malaysia, and southern Thailand. The species is listed as endangered on the IUCN Red List due to habitat destruction and the pet trade.

Taxonomy
The species is generally thought not to have subspecies, but some experts recognise a mountain form and a lowland form.
 Mountain agile gibbon, Hylobates agilis agilis
 Lowland agile gibbon, Hylobates agilis unko

Description
The agile gibbon has fur varying in color from black to red-brown. The brow is white, and the male can be recognized by his white or light-grey cheeks. Additionally, the male is slightly larger than the female. Like all gibbons it is tailless.

Behaviour
With its long arms they swing on branches, brachiating at a fast pace. Like all gibbons, it lives in monogamous pairs in a strictly enforced territory, which is defended with vigorous visual displays and songs. The diet of the agile gibbon is generally frugivorous but have also been observed eating leaves, flowers, and insects.

Females give birth to a single offspring after seven months' gestation. The young gibbon is weaned at barely 2 years of age. When fully mature, at about 8 years, it leaves its family group in order to look for a mate.

Distribution and habitat
The agile gibbon is found on Sumatra southeast of Lake Toba and the Singkil River, in a small area on the Malay Peninsula, and south Thailand near the Malaysian border. It predominantly lives arboreally in rain forests and rarely comes to the ground.

References

External links 

Gibbon Conservation Center
Hylobates agilis at The Primata

agile gibbon
Mammals of Malaysia
Mammals of Thailand
Fauna of Sumatra
Primates of Indonesia
Species endangered by the pet trade
Species endangered by oil palm plantations
Species endangered by roadbuilding
Species endangered by habitat fragmentation
agile gibbon
agile gibbon